The 1990 Estonian SSR Football Championship was won by TVMK. Fosforiit Tallinn and Sport Tallinn played in 1990 Baltic League.

League table

References
 

Estonian Football Championship
Est
Football